The Roman Catholic Archdiocese of Rabat is an ecclesiastical territory or diocese of the Roman Catholic Church in Morocco. It was erected as the Apostolic Vicariate of Rabat on July 2, 1923, by Pope Pius XI, and promoted to the rank of an archdiocese by Pope Pius XII on September 14, 1955.

The archdiocese's mother church and seat of its archbishop is St. Peter's Cathedral, Rabat. Cristóbal López Romero, S.D.B. was appointed as the Archbishop of Rabat on December 29, 2017.

Bishops

Ordinaries

Vicars Apostolic of Rabat 
 Victor Colomban Dreyer, O.F.M Cap. (1923–1927), appointed Vicar Apostolic of Canale di Suez {Suez Canal}, Egypt
 Henri Vielle, O.F.M. (1927–1946)
 Louis Lefèbvre, O.F.M. (1947–1955 see below)

Archbishops of Rabat 
 Louis Lefèbvre, O.F.M. (see above 1955–1968)
 Jean Chabbert, O.F.M. (1968–1982), appointed Archbishop (personal title) of Perpignan-Elne, France
 Hubert Michon (1983–2001)
 Vincent Landel, S.C.J. (2001–2017)
 Cristóbal López Romero, S.D.B. (2017– present ) (Cardinal in 2019)

Coadjutor Archbishops
 Jean-Berchmans-Marcel-Yves-Marie-Bernard Chabbert, O.F.M. (1967-1968)
 Vincent Louis Marie Landel, S.C.I. di Béth. (1999-2001)

Auxiliary Bishop
Pierre-Jean-Marie-Louis Peurois, O.F.M. (1936-1946), resigned; (1957?-1959)

See also
Roman Catholicism in Morocco
Roman Catholic Archdiocese of Tanger

External links
Official website
Catholic-Hierarchy
GCatholic.org

Rabat
Christian organizations established in 1923
Roman Catholic dioceses in Morocco
Roman Catholic dioceses and prelatures established in the 20th century